Mirko Schuster (born 21 July 1994) is a German footballer who plays as a defender for Regionalliga West club SV Rödinghausen.

Playing career

Youth career
Born in Mannheim, Schuster started out playing in the youth ranks of SV Waldhof Mannheim, the local club, before moving to Karlsruher SC in 2007, where he played with the U17 and U19 teams. In the summer of 2012, Shuster trained with the first team during a ten-day camp.

Professional career

In June 2013, Schuster was permanently promoted to the first team, although he never earned a cap. However, he did make 21 appearances with the reserve team in the Oberliga Baden-Württemberg between 2013 and 2014. Schuster sustained a thigh injury while training in Belek in January 2014. He had to be operated on, and missed the remainder of the season for it. He made the move to another 3. Liga team, SG Sonnenhof Großaspach, in January 2015, signing an 18-month contract. He finally made his professional debut on 14 February 2015, playing the full 90 minutes of a 1-1 draw against Hansa Rostock.

References

External links
 Mirko Schuster profile at EuroSport
 Mirko Schuster profile at FuPa
 Mirko Schuster profile at Kicker.de
 Mirko Schuster profile at SoccerPunter
 

Living people
1994 births
German footballers
Footballers from Mannheim
Association football defenders
Karlsruher SC II players
SG Sonnenhof Großaspach players
TSV Steinbach Haiger players
SV Waldhof Mannheim players
VfB Oldenburg players
3. Liga players
Regionalliga players